

This is a partial timeline of significant events in postal history, including dates and events relating to postage stamps.

559–530 BC 
Chapar Khaneh, the state-run courier (and transportation) service of the Persian Empire was established by Cyrus the Great, and later developed by Darius the Great as the royal method of communication throughout the empire.

First century 
Cursus publicus, the state-run courier (and transportation) service of the Roman Empire was established by Augustus based on Chapar Khaneh of the Persians.

Fifteenth century 
 1497 - Franz von Taxis established a postal service on behalf of Emperor Maximilian I of the Holy Roman Empire

Sixteenth century 
 1516 - Henry VIII established a "Master of the Posts"
 1520 - Manuel I creates the public mail service of Portugal, the Correio Público-Public Post Office
 1558 18 October - Sigismund II Augustus established Poczta Polska, a postal service of the Polish–Lithuanian Commonwealth.

Seventeenth century 
 1635 31 July - Charles I made the Royal Mail service available to the public for the first time with postage being paid by the recipient.
 1639 - The General Court of Massachusetts designates the tavern of Richard Fairbanks in Boston as the official repository of overseas mail, making it the first postal establishment in the Thirteen Colonies.
 1647 7 January - H. Morian Granted license på have a postal monopoly "Posten Norge".
 1654 - Oliver Cromwell grants monopoly over service in England to "Office of Postage".
 1660 - General Post Office established in England by Charles II.
 1663 - England's Imperial Post Office is established in the Colony of Barbados.
 1663 - Portugal's Correio-Mor das Cartas do Mar is established in Rio de Janeiro by the 7th High-Courier of the Kingdom of Portugal, Luís Gomes da Mata. 
 1671 - King Louis XIV grants monopoly over service in Paris to the family Pagot and Rouillé.
 1675 - Beat Fischer von Reichenbach granted permission to operate a private postal service in Bern, Switzerland.
 1680 - The first penny post system, known as the London Penny Post, for local delivery was introduced by William Dockwra in London.
 1690 – Leon II Pajot builds a privately operated postal center on 9 rue des Déchargeurs in Paris - International Horse Carriages carry Mail from Paris to Pajot et Rouillé or Thurn und Taxis Post relais around western Europe. The building, the Hôtel de Villeroy still exists, it is used today for private apartments and for the exposition center Cremerie de Paris, the private courtyard can be visited by the public certain days in the summer.

Eighteenth century 
 1738 the Parisian postal family Pajot & Rouille had become one of the wealthiest families in France.The Royal French minister of finance cardinal de Fleury estimates that the postal wealth should belong to the Kings of France and nationalizes the privately run postal enterprise. The postal service also leaves the historic Pajot & Rouille buildings (formerly Hôtel de Villeroy) located on rue des Dechargeurs / rue des Bourdonnais.
 1775 - The Continental Congress appoints Benjamin Franklin to be the first United States Postmaster General.
 1792 20 February - The US Postal Service Act establishes the United States Post Office Department.

1820s 
 1821 - Carlo Meratti, an Italian, living in Alexandria, establishes a post office to send and receive mail to and from foreign countries.
 1825 - The US establishes a dead letter office.
 1828 - Hellenic postal service established.

1830s 

 1830 – First mail train in United Kingdom of Great Britain and Ireland.
 1831 - Independent Irish and Scottish Post Offices united under the Postmaster General of the United Kingdom, 31 years after the Act of Union
 1839 5 December - Uniform Fourpenny Post starts throughout the UK.

1840s 

 1840 10 January - Uniform Penny Post starts throughout the United Kingdom.
 1840 1 May - United Kingdom issues the Penny Black and Two Pence Blue, the world's first postage stamps.
 1840 6 May - The Penny Black and Two Pence Blue, world's first postage stamps, become valid for the pre-payment of postage.
 1842 1 February City Despatch Post New York local post.
 1843 1 March - Zürich issue their first stamps: Zurich 4 and Zurich 6.
 1843 1 August - Bull's Eyes, first stamps of Brazil
 1843 30 September - Geneva issue their first stamps: Double Geneva.
 1845 - Creation of the New York Postmaster's Provisional
 1845 - The US star routes begin operation.
 1847 1 July The United States issues its first stamps.
 1847 21 September Mauritius issues its first stamps, the Mauritius "Post Office" stamps, or the Red Penny and Blue Penny.
 1848 - first use of Perot Provisionals in Bermuda
 1849 1 January - first stamps of France
 1849 1 July - first stamps of Belgium, known as the "Epaulettes" type
 1849 1 November - first stamps of Bavaria

1850s 

 1850 1 January New South Wales issues its first stamps.
 1850 1 January Spain issues its first stamps.
 1850 3 January Victoria issues its first stamps.
 1850 7 April Federal Switzerland issues its first stamps.
 1850 1 June Austria and Kingdom of Lombardy–Venetia issue their first stamps.
 1850 29 June Saxony issues its first stamps.
 1850 1 July British Guiana issues its first stamps.
 1850 15 November Prussia issues its first stamps.
 1851 1 April Denmark issues its first stamp.
 1851 23 April - The Province of Canada issues its first stamp, the Three-Penny Beaver, designed by Sandford Fleming.
 1851 - Kingdom of Hawaii issues Hawaiian Missionaries, first stamps.
 1852 - New Brunswick issues its first stamps.
 1852 - The Netherlands issues its first stamps.
 1852 - Scinde Dawks in India
 1852 - first stamps of Barbados
 1852 - US issues its first stamped envelopes.
 1853 - first stamps of Portugal
 1853 1 November - first stamps of Tasmania
 1854 - first stamps of India
 1854 - first stamps of Western Australia
 1855 - first stamps of South Australia
 1855 - US initiates registered mail service.
 1855 - US makes prepayment of postage compulsory.
 1855 - first stamps of New Zealand
 1856 1 August - first stamps of Mexico
 1856 21 August - first stamps of Corrientes
 1856 - first stamps of Danish West Indies
 1856 - British Guiana 1c magenta issued
 1857 - 1 April - Ceylon(Sri Lanka) issues its first stamp.
 1857 - Newfoundland issues its first stamps.
 1858 29 April - Buenos Aires issues its first stamps.
 1858 1 May - Argentine Confederation issues its first stamps.
 1858 21 July - Moldavia issues its first stamps, just a year before the state's dissolution.
 1858 28 October - Cordoba issues its first stamps.
 1858 - London is divided into postal districts, precursor of British Postcode System.
 1859 - Bahamas issues its first stamps.

1860s 
 1860 1 November - first stamps of Queensland
 1860 1 December - first stamps of Malta
 1860 - Jamaica issues its first stamps.
 1860 - The Pony Express operates in the western United States for a short time.
 1860 - A stamp is issued for British Columbia and Vancouver Island.
 1861 - American Civil War begins, postmasters in South make provisional issues.
 1861 - first official stamps of Confederate States of America
 1861 1 October - first stamps of Greece
 1862 11 January - first stamps of Argentine Republic
 1862 - first stamps of Antigua
 1863 - Bolivia creates a private contract for mail but rescinds it six weeks later.
 1863 - First stamps issued by the Ottoman Empire.
 1864 - United States establishes railroad post offices.
 1865 1 November - British Columbia issues first stamps.
 1865 - Bermuda has its first regular stamp issue.
 1865 - Vancouver Island issues only stamps solely for the island.
 1866 - first stamps of Serbia
 1866 - British Honduras issues its first stamps.
 1866 - Lombardy-Venetia annexed by Italy, including postal services
 1866 - first stamps of Egypt
 1867 1 July - The State of Prussia nationalizes the centuries-old private Thurn und Taxis Post.
 1867 1 July - The Province of Canada is joined by Nova Scotia and New Brunswick, creating the Dominion of Canada.
 1867 - first stamps of Bolivia
 1867 - first stamps of Austrian post offices in the Turkish Empire
 1868 - first stamps of Persia
 1868 - first stamps of Azores

1870s 

 1870 - Angola issues its first stamps.
 1871 - Afghanistan issues its first stamps.
 1871 20 April - Japan issues its first stamps.
 1871 20 July - British Columbia joins Canada, which takes over postal services.
 1873 1 July - Prince Edward Island joins Canada, which takes over postal services.
 1873 - Iceland issues its first stamps.
 1874 9 October - General Postal Union (later Universal Postal Union) is formed.
 1878 - General Postal Union becomes the Universal Postal Union.
 1879 1 June - Bulgaria issues its first stamps a year after its independence.

1880s 

 1882 - stamps of Straits Settlements overprinted at Bangkok
 1883 - first stamps of Siam (Thailand)
 1885 - United States initiates special delivery service.
 1886 - first stamps of British Bechuanaland
 1886 - first stamps of Congo Free State (Belgian Congo)
 1888 - first stamps of Bechuanaland Protectorate

1890s 

 1890 - first stamps of the Republic of the United States of Brazil
 1890 - first stamps of British East Africa
 1891 - first stamps of British Central Africa
 1892 January 2 - first stamps of British South Africa Company, Rhodesia
 1892 - first stamps of Anjouan
 1892 - first stamps of Angra
 1892 - first stamps of Benin
 1893 - Hawaiian monarchy overthrown, first stamps of republic
 1895 - stamps of Dahomey supersede those of Benin
 1894 - first stamps of French Somali Coast (today Djibouti)
 1896 - United States experiments with rural free delivery, is made permanent in 1902.
 1897 - Germany issues first stamps for its colony of Kamerun.
 1898 - First stamps of Cuba under American military occupation
 1898 - Puerto Rico stamps issued under US administration
 1899 - US stamps overprinted for use in Guam
 1899 - first stamps of the Philippines (overprinted US issues)
 1899 - US stamps supersede those of Hawaii

1900s 

 1900 - first stamps of Kiautchou, German colony in China
 1903 - first stamps of Aitutaki
 1903 - first stamps of Austrian post offices in Crete
 1904 - first stamps of Panama Canal Zone
 1906 - first stamps of Brunei, overprints on Labuan
 1908 - first stamps of the Belgian Congo under Belgian administration

1910s 

 1911 - January 1 - first stamps of the Gilbert and Ellice Islands.
 1911 - United States creates a postal savings system.
 1912 - last stamps of Anjouan, superseded by Madagascar
 1913 - first stamps of Australia, superseding those of the various former colonies
 1913 5 May - first stamps of Albania
 1913 - United States initiates parcel post service, using special stamps.
 1915 - 15 August - British forces overprint Iranian stamps in Bushire, use until 16 October.
 1915 - British and French occupation forces overprint stamps for Cameroon.
 1916 - United States postal inspectors solve the last known stagecoach robbery in the US.
 1917- British armed forces in Palestine issue the famous EEF stamps. December 1917
 1918 - United States issues its first airmail stamps; a sheet of the Inverted Jenny is discovered among them.
 1918 - first stamps of the Italian occupation of Trieste and Trentino
 1919 - first stamps of Armenia and Azerbaijan
 1919 - first stamps of Batum

1920s 

 1920 - plebiscite stamps for Allenstein
 1920 - largest private US postage company, Pitney Bowes formed.
 1920 - first stamps of French Upper Volta
 1920 June - first stamps of La Aguera
 1921 - East Africa and Uganda Protectorates issues stamps.
 1921 - France issues first stamps for its mandate of Cameroon.
 1922 13 July - Barbuda overprints stamps of Leeward Islands.
 1922 - Karelia, briefly independent, issues stamps
 1922 - first stamps of British Kenya and Uganda
 1922 - first stamps of Ascension Island
 1922 - last stamps of La Aguera
 1922 - first stamps of Irish Free State
 1923 - first stamps of Jordan (as a British mandate)
 1923 - first stamps of Transcaucasian SFSR, superseding those of Armenia
 1923 - first stamps of Iraq
 1923 - first stamps of Kuwait
 1924 - first stamps of French Algeria
 1925 - first stamps of Alaouites
 1927-  First new [4]stamps for the civil administration in Palestine.
 1928 - first stamps of Spanish Andorra

1930s 

 1931 16 June - first stamps of French Andorra
 1933 10 August - first stamps of Bahrain, issued by Indian postal administration
 1933 1 December - first stamps of Basutoland
 1935 May - common issue of stamps for Silver Jubilee of King George V
 1935 15 November - first stamps of Commonwealth of the Philippines
 1935 - first stamps of Kenya, Uganda, Tanganyika
 1935 - United States initiates Trans-Pacific airmail service.
 1937 1 April - first stamps of Aden
 1937 1 April - first stamps of Burma, overprints on India
 1937 12 May - common issue of stamps for coronation of King George VI
 1938 14 April - stamps issued for Alexandretta, last on 10 November
 1938 1 December - first stamps issued for Greenland
 1938 - Austrian stamps are phased out after the Anschluss.
 1939 - Postal censorship introduced in several countries, both combatants and neutrals, involved in World War II

1940s 
 1940 - Pitcairn Islands issue their first stamps.
 1941 - United States creates highway post offices.
 1942 - United States uses V-mail to handle armed forces' mail.
 1945 May - provisional stamps issued for Austria
 1946 - first stamps of independent Jordan
 1947 - India gains independence from Britain
 1948 - Israel issues its first stamps-The Doar Ivri set. 16 May 1948 [The new country still has no name]
 1948 - Israel issues its first Israel stamps with the word ISRAEL on the stamps. 26 September 1948
 1948 - British postal administration takes over in Bahrain
 1948 - Pakistan issues its first stamps.
 1949 - Newfoundland joins Canada and issues its last stamps.
 1949 18 July - Ryukyu Islands issues its first stamps.

1950s 

 1951 - Cambodia issues its first stamps.
 1951 - United Nations issues its first stamps.
 1955 - United States initiates certified mail service.
 1957 - United States establishes Citizens' Stamp Advisory Committee to choose stamp designs
 1958 23 April - members of West Indies Federation make a joint stamp issue.
 1959 - UK Postcode scheme introduced.
 1959 - The Republic of Upper Volta issues its first stamps.
 1959 - The USS Barbero and United States Postal Service attempt the delivery of mail via Missile Mail.

1960s 

 1960 July - Katanga secedes from Congo, issues stamps until 1961.
 1960 1 October - UK trust territory of the Cameroons issues stamps, in use into 1961.
 1961 1 October - Independent Cameroon issues its first stamps.
 1962 April - Bhutan issues its first stamps.
 1962 1 July - Burundi issues its first stamps.
 1963 - United States introduces the ZIP Code.
 1963 1 February - British Antarctic Territory issues its first stamps.
 1963 12 December - Kenya issues its first stamps.
 1964 - First stamps issued by independent Republic of Malta.
 1964 - 9 February - Sierra Leone issues the world's first self-adhesive stamps.
 1964 30 March - Abu Dhabi issues its first stamps.
 1964 20 June - Ajman issues its first stamps.
 1966 30 September - first stamps of Botswana
 1966 2 December - first stamps of independent Barbados
 1966 - United States ends its postal savings system.
 1967 21 August - first stamps of Afars and Issas
 1967 4 September - first stamps of Anguilla
 1968 17 January - first stamps of British Indian Ocean Territory
 1968 19 November - first regular stamps of Barbuda
 1968 - United States initiates priority mail as a type of first-class mail.

1970s 

 1970 - United States passes Postal Reorganization Act, which changed the postal service from a government department to a corporation owned by the government.
 1970 - United States initiates experimental express mail service, makes it permanent in 1977.
 1971 - United States Postal Service begins operation as a corporation.
 1971 1 April - Canadian six-character postal codes introduced.
 1971 29 July - Bangladesh issues its first stamps.
 1973 1 June - Belize issues its first stamps.
 1974 - United States ends its use of highway post offices.
 1975 11 November - first stamp of independent Angola
 1975 8 December - first stamps of renamed Benin
 1976 1 January - first stamps of Tuvalu, formerly the Ellice Islands.
 1976 1 January - first stamps of the Gilbert Islands (changed to Kiribati in 1979)
 1977 30 June - United States ends use of railroad post offices.
 1978 - United States begins to copyright postage stamps and other philatelic items.
 1979 12 July - first stamps of Kiribati, formerly the Gilbert Islands.
 1979 - Canal Zone transferred to Panama along with postal service.

1980s 

 1982 - United States introduces E-COM, an electronic message service.
 1983 - United States introduces ZIP + 4.
 1984 21 November - first stamps of Burkina Faso
 1985 - Jackie Strange, first female Deputy US Postmaster General
 1985 - United States terminates E-COM service.
 1986 1 January - first stamps of Aruba

1990s 

 1992 20 March - Belarus issues its first stamps.
 1992 26 March - Azerbaijan resumes issuing stamps.
 1992 - Kazakhstan issues its first stamps.
 1994 28 January - Canada issues the world's first 2 part customizable greetings stamps.

2000s 
 2000, 28 December - Canada issues the world's first 2 part personalized photo stamps, called "Picture Postage".
 2007, 12 April - USPS issues a non-denominated stamp called the forever stamp
 2011, 13 July - newly independent South Sudan issues its first postage stamps.
 2015, 1 February - Megan Brennan appointed first female US Postmaster General

References

Further reading
 Wood, Kenneth A. Post Dates: A Chronology of Intriguing Events in the Mails and Philately. Albany, OR.: Van Dahl Publications, 1985  370p.

Postal history
Postal history